Edward Thomas Pereira (26 September 1866 – 25 February 1939) was an English priest and schoolmaster, and a cricketer who played first-class cricket between 1895 and 1900 for Warwickshire and the Marylebone Cricket Club (MCC). He was born in Colwich, Staffordshire and died at Edgbaston, Birmingham.

Pereira was sent to The Oratory School at Edgbaston at the age of 10 on the death of his father and came under the influence of Cardinal Newman; he became a Roman Catholic priest and schoolmaster. By 1910, he was headmaster of the Oratory School and he was in charge at the time of its move from Birmingham to Caversham, near Reading, where his family had owned property. He retired from the headmastership in 1930, and was named as Warden in 1934, but was forced by ill health to retire to Birmingham Oratory in 1935.

As a cricketer, Pereira was a right-handed middle order batsman; he also bowled right-arm fast, but only bowled two overs in first-class cricket. He played five times for Warwickshire in 1895 and 1896 and his best batting came in his first match, the game against Kent, when he top-scored with 34 in Warwickshire's first innings and made 24, just one behind Willie Quaife's 25, in the second. Against the 1896 Australians, he was praised for his fielding, being rated as the finest fielder at point that the Australians had encountered. He played two games for MCC in 1900: in the first of these, he captained a team containing Arthur Conan Doyle against a London County side captained by W. G. Grace.

Pereira's older brother was George Pereira, the soldier and explorer, and his younger brother was Cecil Pereira, also a distinguished soldier; both brothers were knighted.

References

1866 births
1939 deaths
English cricketers
English people of Portuguese descent
Warwickshire cricketers
Marylebone Cricket Club cricketers
People educated at The Oratory School